Trams in Birmingham may refer to: 
Birmingham Corporation Tramways (1904–1953)
West Midlands Metro (1999–)